Silene longicilia is a species of flowering plant of the family Caryophyllaceae. It is endemic to Portugal.

Distribution and habitat
The species is endemic to west central Portugal and it ranges from Figueira da Foz and Coimbra in the north, to Sesimbra and a part of Alentejo in the south, and has its greatest extent in limestone soils at Serras de Aire e Candeeiros, Serra de Montejunto, Serra De Sintra and an isolated population in Serra da Arrábida.

References

longicilia
Endemic flora of Portugal
Endemic flora of the Iberian Peninsula